Webdings is a TrueType dingbat typeface developed in 1997. It was initially distributed with Internet Explorer 4.0, then as part of Core fonts for the Web, and is included in all versions of Microsoft Windows since Windows 98. All of the pictographic Webding glyphs that are not unifiable with existing Unicode characters were added to the Unicode Standard when version 7.0 was released in June 2014.

Symbol types

There are some "categories" of symbols in Webdings; groups of similar symbols. Symbol trends like this in the font include weather icons, land with different structures built on top, vehicles and ICT. Symbols which are the Webdings equivalent of characters not available on an English keyboard also exist in the font (for example, the dove and Earth symbols).

An unusual character in the font was the "man in business suit levitating", a humanized exclamation point. According to Vincent Connare, who designed the font, the character was intended as a nod to the logo of the British ska record label 2 Tone Records. The character has since been adopted as an emoji: .

Connare also designed the lightning bolt symbol to resemble the one on the cover of the David Bowie album Aladdin Sane.

Following the controversy over possible anti-Semitic messages in the Wingdings font, Connare intentionally rendered the Webdings character sequence "NYC" as an eye, a heart, and a city skyline, referring to the I Love New York logo.

Character set

Vincent Connare 
The man who created Webdings also created several other fonts including Comic Sans and Trebuchet MS. Webdings was created due to the demand of the new digital age; hence Connare was told to draft up a font that was "creative," "friendly" and "hand-drawn". Jennifer Niederst, author of "Web Design in a Nutshell: A Desktop Quick Reference," talks about Connare's work with type, including Webdings. Niederst states in her book, "These fonts have generous character spacing, large x-heights, and open, rounded features that make them better for online reading," which further comments on the kind of fonts Connare was told to create.

Opportunities 
People such as Karl Pentzlin have proposed that dingbat typefaces, such as Webdings, be encoded to Apple devices or more handheld devices in general. There are also organizations and individuals such as Michal Suignard who have created proposals for Webdings to be encoded in the "international character encoding standard Unicode". Both of these proposal examples also include other dingbat typefaces such as Wingdings.

Webdings has also been used to help create artwork. In the case of Pat Boas, it has been stated that in Boas's work titled, “Abstraction Machine,” she "began by typing 'poison' in the font called 'Webdings,'..." which helped Boas to create a painting that challenged the audience to de-code its meaning. Boas also notes how the artwork captures a dialogue between the Webdings typeface, which is based in logic, and the handpainted artwork, which is "sensuous".

See also 
 Core fonts for the Web
 Wingdings

References

External links
Webdings font information (Microsoft typography)
Webdings info page (Microsoft typography)
Downloadable version of Webdings for Windows (Core fonts for the Web)

Symbol typefaces
Infographics
Typefaces and fonts introduced in 1997
Windows XP typefaces